Nikephoros Basilakes, frequently encountered simply as Basilakios (Βασιλάκιος), Latinized as Nicephorus Basilacius, was a Byzantine general and aristocrat of the late 11th century, who in 1078/79 tried to overthrow the Emperor Nikephoros III Botaneiates and was defeated by Alexios Komnenos.

In the chaos that surrounded the dethronement of Michael VII, Nikephoros Basilakes, at the time doux of Dyrrhachium decided that his time had arrived. Moving into position at Thessalonica, he waited for the outcome of the clash between two other claimants to the throne, Nikephoros III and Nikephoros Bryennios, in order that he might quickly crush the exhausted victor.

His forces consisted of veteran Frankish, Sclavenian, Albanian and Greek soldiers, and his confidence in his own abilities and courage convinced him that victory would easily be his. Nikephoros III sent his best general, Alexios Komnenos to deal with him, and Alexios managed to entrap Basilakes in a night attack on the imperial camp, on the banks of the Vardar River, some eighteen miles distant from Thessalonica. Defeated, Basilakes fled to Thessalonica where he attempted to defend the city, but was seized by his own soldiers and delivered to Nikephoros III who ordered that Basilakes be blinded.

References

Sources 
 
 
 George Finlay, History of the Byzantine and Greek Empires from 1057 - 1453, Volume 2, William Blackwood & Sons, 1854

11th-century Byzantine people
Byzantine governors of Dyrrhachium
Byzantine usurpers
Nikephoros